is a Japanese football player. She played for Japan national team.

Club career
Kohata was born in Hiroshima Prefecture on November 12, 1989. After graduating from Waseda University, she joined Urawa Reds in 2012. She was selected Best Young Player awards in 2012 season. She was also selected Best Eleven in 2014 season. She played 124 matches for the club in L.League until 2018 season. She left the club end of 2018 season. In February 2019, she joined AS Harima Albion.

National team career
In May 2014, Kohata was selected Japan national team for 2014 Asian Cup. At this competition, on May 18, she debuted against Jordan. Japan won the championship. She played 2 games for Japan until 2015.

National team statistics

References

External links

Japan Football Association
Urawa Reds

1989 births
Living people
Waseda University alumni
Association football people from Hiroshima Prefecture
Japanese women's footballers
Japan women's international footballers
Nadeshiko League players
Urawa Red Diamonds Ladies players
AS Harima Albion players
Women's association football defenders
Universiade silver medalists for Japan
Universiade medalists in football
Medalists at the 2009 Summer Universiade
Medalists at the 2011 Summer Universiade